Paramysis (from the Greek affix , "near", "beside", and the genus name Mysis) is a genus of mysid crustaceans (Mysidacea) in family Mysidae, distributed in coastal zone of low boreal East Atlantic Ocean, Mediterranean Sea and the basins of Black Sea, Sea of Azov and Caspian Sea (Ponto-Caspian Basin).

Biogeography
The majority of Paramysis species are brackish- or freshwater endemics of the Ponto-Caspian Basin; some of them naturally spread more than  up large rivers, including the Volga, Don, Dnieper and Danube. A number of Ponto-Caspian species have been introduced outside the native range. Marine species from the Atlantic Ocean and Mediterranean Sea have probably descended from ancient Ponto-Caspian populations.

Diversity
There are 24 species classified into 7 subgenera. The largest species, like P. eurylepis, P. inflata, are found only in the Caspian Sea. Generic characters: subrostral plate; large eyes on short stalk; antennal scale with smooth outer margin, ended by strong spine, and distal segment rudimentary with five setae; four segments of pereiopod 1–4 carpopropodus; five segments in pleopod 4 of male. Consumed by fishes; particularly important for juvenile sturgeons and zander.

Two extinct species, previously included into this genus, have been recently moved into extinct genus Sarmysis.

Species

Subgenus Paramysis sensu stricto
Paramysis baeri Czerniavsky, 1882
Paramysis bakuensis G. O. Sars, 1895
Paramysis eurylepis G. O. Sars, 1907
Paramysis kessleri (Grimm in G. O. Sars, 1895)

Subgenus Metamysis G. O. Sars, 1893
Paramysis grimmi (G. O. Sars, 1895)
Paramysis inflata (G. O. Sars, 1907)
Paramysis ullskyi Czerniavsky, 1882

Subgenus Serrapalpisis Daneliya, 2004
Paramysis incerta G. O. Sars, 1895
Paramysis kosswigi Băcescu, 1948
Paramysis lacustris (Czerniavsky, 1882)
Paramysis sowinskii Daneliya, 2002

Subgenus Mesomysis Czerniavsky, 1882
Paramysis intermedia (Czerniavsky, 1882)

Subgenus Nanoparamysis Daneliya, 2004
Paramysis loxolepis (G. O. Sars, 1895)

Subgenus Longidentia Daneliya, 2004
Paramysis adriatica Wittmann, Ariani et Daneliya, 2016
Paramysis helleri (G. O. Sars, 1877)
Paramysis kroyeri (Czerniavsky, 1882)
Paramysis nouveli (Labat, 1953)
Paramysis agigensis Băcescu, 1940

Subgenus Pseudoparamysis Băcescu, 1940
Paramysis bacescoi Labat, 1953
Paramysis pontica (Băcescu, 1940)

Incertae sedis
Paramysis festae Colosi, 1922
Paramysis portzicensis Nouvel, 1950
Paramysis proconnesia Colosi, 1922
Paramysis arenosa (G. O. Sars, 1877)

References

Mysida